Liberty Township is a township in Clinton County, Iowa, USA.  As of the 2000 census, its population was 374.

History
Liberty Township was organized in 1844.

Geography
According to the USGS, it contains two cemeteries: Rose Hill and Saint James.

Notes

References
 USGS Geographic Names Information System (GNIS)

External links
 US-Counties.com
 City-Data.com

Townships in Clinton County, Iowa
Townships in Iowa
1844 establishments in Iowa Territory